Lousy with Sylvianbriar is the twelfth studio album by indie rock band of Montreal. It was released on 8 October 2013. It was recorded at Sunlandic Studios. All songs were engineered by Drew Vandenberg except "Raindrop In My Skull" and "Colossus" done by Kevin Barnes.

Track listing

Artwork and packaging

The motorcycle shown on the cover is a Honda CL360 from the mid-1970s.

Personnel
Kevin Barnes – vocals, guitar, bass guitar
Rebecca Cash – vocals
Clayton Rychlik – drums, percussion, vocals
Jojo Glidewell – piano, keys
Bennett Lewis – guitars, mandolin, vocals
Bob Parins – bass guitar, pedal steel, upright bass

Additional performers 
Kishi Bashi – strings on "Hegira Emigre" 
Laura Lutzke – strings on "Raindrop in My Skull"
Marie Davon – strings on "Sirens of Your Toxic Spirit

References

Of Montreal albums
Polyvinyl Record Co. albums
2013 albums